Cheshmeh Sangi (also Romanized as Cheshmeh Sangī) is a village in Parsinah Rural District, in the Central District of Sonqor County, Kermanshah Province, Iran. At the 2006 census, its population was 143, in 32 families.

References 

Populated places in Sonqor County